Raj Bhavan is the common name of the official residences of the governors of the states of India and may refer to:

List of Raj Bhavan

See also
Raj Niwas
Rashtrapati Bhavan
Rashtrapati Nilayam
Rashtrapati Niwas
Vice President's House

Governors' houses in India
Official residences in India